Montreal Supra was a Canadian professional soccer club based in Montreal, Quebec that played in the  Canadian Soccer League from 1988 to 1992.

History

Montreal Supra joined the Canadian Soccer League as an expansion franchise for the league's second season in 1988. They were Montreal's first professional soccer team, since the NASL's Montreal Manic and CPSL's FC Inter-Montréal folded in 1983. It was created by an investment by O'Keefe Brewery, one of Canada's three largest breweries, as the main sponsor. The club was to be a community property as a non-profit corporation controlled by a board of directors made up of 12 voters: six founding companies (including O'Keefe) plus six representatives of small investors.

Supra had a difficult inaugural season, finishing last in the East Division with a record of 8-8-12 and failing to make the playoffs. The team also struggled in their second season winning only 3 of their 26 matches, once again failing to make the playoffs. The team struggled financially, with the players agreeing to play without pay in 1989, later being paid with Ultramar gas coupons. In 1990, they greatly improved to a record of 13-11-2, qualifying for the playoffs for the first time, but lost in the first round to Hamilton. Prior to the 1991 season, former Montreal Manic coach Eddie Firmani was hired as the named coach and general manager of the team. In 1991, they finished 5th out of 8 teams, qualifying for the playoffs for the second year in a row, where they were once again defeated by Hamilton in the first round. In their final season, they finished in 4th place out of 8 teams, qualifying for the playoffs for the third consecutive year, where they were once again eliminated in the first round, this time by the Vancouver 86ers. In 1992, the club also competed in the Professional Cup, one of two invited CSL teams along with Vancouver, where they were eliminated in the first round by APSL club Tampa Bay Rowdies, losing 7-1 on aggregate (5-1 and 2-0).

The team underwent severe financial difficulty in the early 1990s, ultimately with a Florida-based Spanish businessman named Frank Aliaga, who had ties to Canada, purchased the club in 1990 to keep the club in operation, as the previous season the players had not received a salary. His ownership was not without controversy, with Aliaga's son, Frank Jr., often featuring in the team's Starting 11, with players commenting that they effectively had to play "10 vs 11" at all times, due to the owner's son's lack of quality. In addition, over the club's three seasons owned by Aliaga, the club went through six coaches.
After the 1991 season, the team's main sponsors - Ultramar, Molson O'Keefe and Saputo - indicated that they were no longer interested in sponsoring the team.  Aliaga hired Pino Asaro, who had been the manager of the Cosmos de LaSalle in the semi-professional Ligue nationale de soccer du Québec at the end of the 1980s, as general manager to help save the franchise. He managed to convince the sponsors to remain with the club and also attracted Bell Long Distance as a new sponsor. At the same time, the league was not doing well financially either, with the league commissioner, Dale Barnes, leaving and Supra owner Frank Aliaga being named the new league president. 

After the 1992 season the league was set to fold, and Aliaga approached Asaro to inquire into the possibility of the club joining the US-based American Professional Soccer League. Montreal had been approved by the APSL, however, Aliaga was not able to meet the financial requirements to enter a club in the league, as Supra's budget was only one-third of the APSL's minimum requirement. APSL commissioner Bill Sage inquired to Asaro if there was any interest from another party about operating a Montreal APSL team and Asaro immediately called Joey Saputo, who was able to arrange a meeting with Lino Saputo, owner of Saputo Inc., one of Supra's four main sponsors about taking over the team.

The Saputos purchased the club from Aliaga, and wanted the club to be the successor to Supra, maintaining much of the team's organizational staff and players for the new team. Supra was dissolved and a new club called the Montreal Impact formed as a new APSL club. Many of Montreal Supra's best players would join the expansion Impact, winning the league championship in 1994, during the team's second season.

Seasons

Notable players

Head coaches
 Andy Onorato (1988–1989)
  Pierre Mindru (1989–1990 and 1991–1992)
 Roy Wiggemansen (1990–1991)
  Eddie Firmani (1991)
 Paolo Ferrante (1991)
 Bobby Vosmaer (1992)
 Pino Asaro (1992)

See also
Montreal Manic
Montreal Olympique
Montreal Impact (1992–2011)
CF Montréal

References

Canadian Soccer League (1987–1992) teams
Defunct soccer clubs in Canada
Soccer clubs in Quebec
Supra
1988 establishments in Quebec
1992 disestablishments in Quebec
Association football clubs established in 1988
Association football clubs disestablished in 1992